Punta de Piedras is a settlement in the Colombian Department of Magdalena. It is located 35km south-west of Pivijay.

This settlement is not to be confused with Punta de Piedras in Isla Margarita.

References

Populated places in the Magdalena Department